Keena is both a given name and surname. Notable people with the name include:

Given name
 Keena Rothhammer (born 1957), American Olympic swimmer
 Keena Turner (born 1958), American football player
 Keena Young (born 1985), American basketball player

Surname
 Inaam Keena  (born 2004) , Indian Martial Arts Player and Media Personality 
 Aidan Keena (born 1999), Irish football player
 Leo J. Keena (1878–1967), American football player and diplomat
 Monica Keena (born 1979), American actress and model